Ali Velshi (born October 29, 1968 or 1969) is a Canadian television journalist, a senior economic and business correspondent for NBC News since October 2016. He was also substitute anchor for  Top Story with Tom Llamas on NBC News Now at weeknights and The Last Word with Lawrence O'Donnell on MSNBC at Friday night. Velshi is based in New York City. Known for his work on CNN, he was CNN's Chief Business Correspondent, anchor of CNN's Your Money and a co-host of CNN International's weekday business show World Business Today. In 2013, he joined Al Jazeera America, a channel that launched in August of that year. He hosted Ali Velshi on Target until Al Jazeera America ceased operations on April 12, 2016. He has worked for MSNBC since October 2016.

Personal life
Velshi was born in Nairobi, Kenya, and raised in Toronto, Ontario, after moving there in 1971. He is an Ismaili Muslim of Gujarati Indian descent. He is the son of Murad Velshi, the first Canadian of Indian origin elected to the Legislative Assembly of Ontario, and his wife, Mila, also Indian, who grew up in South Africa. Velshi's parents operated a bakery in South Africa, but moved to Kenya in 1960, when Apartheid became oppressive. In Toronto, Velshi's parents operate a chain of travel agencies. 

Velshi attended Toronto's Northern Secondary School, where he was elected school president. He then earned a degree in religious studies from Queen's University in Kingston, Ontario, in 1994. During his time at Queen's he made news by organizing protests against Preston Manning and Canada's Reform Party. In 2010, he was awarded the Queen's University Alumni Achievement Award. In 2016, he was awarded an honorary doctorate of laws by his alma mater.

Velshi was married briefly in his twenties. In 2009, he married his second wife, New York–born hedge fund manager Lori Wachs, the president of Philadelphia-based Cross Ledge Investments, whom he met when she was a guest on his show. The couple have one child together, a daughter. Velshi divides his time between an apartment in New York City and his home in Montgomery County, Pennsylvania.

Career
In 1996, Velshi was awarded a fellowship to the United States Congress from the American Political Science Association. In this capacity he worked with Lee H. Hamilton, then a Democratic Representative from Indiana.

Television
In Toronto, Velshi began his professional reporting career as a General Assignment reporter for CFTO. He later became a business reporter and anchor for CablePulse 24 and its then sister station CityTV. In 1999, he joined Report on Business Television, (now BNN Bloomberg - Business News Network) Canada's first all-business news specialty channel. Velshi hosted The Business News, Canada's first prime-time business news hour.

CNN
Velshi moved to the U.S. in September 2001, joining business news channel CNNfn in New York City. He anchored several shows, including Insights, Business Unusual, Street Sweep, and Your Money, and co-hosted The Money Gang with Pat Kiernan before the network closed down in December 2004. Reassigned to the main CNN network, he remained a business anchor and reporter posted initially to CNN's early-morning program Daybreak. In 2005, Velshi hosted 13 hour-long episodes of The Turnaround, a reality television show, during which he traveled across America introducing small business owners who were facing challenges or seeking to grow their businesses to high-profile mentors who helped the small business owners develop a plan for success. After The Turnaround, Velshi was assigned to the newly launched The Situation Room from 2005 to 2006. Velshi joined American Morning as business correspondent in late 2006 and then again as co-anchor in 2011. In 2008, Velshi undertook a cross-country road trip aboard the CNN Election Express, during which he travelled from Myrtle Beach, South Carolina, to Los Angeles, California, stopping along the way to discuss money issues with Americans. Velshi also spent 10 days riding the CNN Election Express through rural Texas before that state's March 4, 2008, primaries.

Velshi regularly was a substitute anchor for CNN/U.S. programs such as American Morning. On Saturday and Sunday he co-hosted a business program called Your Money. Velshi also hosted CNN's Energy Hunt, which took him to the Arctic National Wildlife Refuge and to the Oil Sands of Canada in 2008. Tragic events during 2008 brought Velshi more airtime, including reporting from the now-destroyed Marriott Hotel in Islamabad, Pakistan, after the killing of Benazir Bhutto. During coverage of Hurricanes Gustav and Ike, Velshi appeared on air, on location from hurricane-stricken areas, as the storms hit. Velshi's hurricane reporting started in 2005 during Katrina, about which he reported live during the evacuation of an oil rig in the Gulf of Mexico and then from damaged oil facilities in Eastern Texas and Southern Louisiana.

During the financial crisis of 2007–2008, Velshi again appeared on television frequently throughout the day on shows like American Morning and Anderson Cooper 360° and took viewers' live calls during special editions of Your Money and during his weekly call-in radio show. Until leaving CNN, Velshi co-hosted the market opening edition of World Business Today on CNN International.

Being Muslim, Velshi regularly acknowledges his background and perspective when discussions involve Islam. Velshi has strongly defended the Muslim community's right to build a mosque and Islamic center (Park51) near Ground Zero in New York City. Velshi has also been critical of Peter King's hearings on Islamic radicalization in the United States as a form of Islamophobia, branding King as "naive". Velshi supports the separation of mosque and state and rejects "Political Islam", which requires the implementation of Sharia law. He has been in turn accused of downplaying the role that mainstream Islamic jurisprudence, scholarship, and interpretation play in the development and application of Islamic extremism and branding negative statements about Islam as biased.

Al Jazeera America
On April 4, 2013, it was announced that Velshi would be leaving CNN to join Al Jazeera America to host a weekly 30-minute magazine-style prime-time program called Real Money with Ali Velshi. He was the first on-air personality to be hired for the new channel. The channel stated that it hoped that Velshi's show would initially start off as a weekly show and become a daily show by the end of the year. Real Money with Ali Velshi launched on August 20, 2013, as a daily weekday show. On May 12, 2015, the show relaunched as Ali Velshi on Target. This show ended in April 2016 when Al Jazeera America shut down.

MSNBC and NBC 
Velshi joined MSNBC in October 2016, with additional duties at MSNBC's parent news division, NBC News, for which he serves as Business Correspondent.

Velshi initially co-anchored the 1:00 PM ET MSNBC news program Velshi & Ruhle with Stephanie Ruhle, as well as having his own 3:00 PM ET news program MSNBC Live with Ali Velshi. Velshi was also appointed as the fill-in host of The Last Word with Lawrence O'Donnell on Friday edition.

However, in December 2019, Velshi was moved to weekend mornings with his own show called simply Velshi, a 2-hour solo act. He continues to substitute for other hosts in the weekday evening lineups.

Writings
Velshi is represented by the New York literary agency N.S. Bienstock and by speaking agency Greater Talent Network. His first book, Gimme My Money Back: Your Guide to Beating the Financial Crisis, was published on January 2, 2009. His second book, How to Speak Money: The Language & Knowledge You Need Now, co-authored by longtime friend and co-anchor Christine Romans, was released by John Wiley & Sons in November 2011. Velshi has written monthly columns for both Money and Delta Sky magazine.

Awards and recognition
In 2010, Velshi was awarded the Queen's University Alumni Achievement Award; the highest award given to Queen's University alumni. Also in 2010, Velshi's in-depth reporting for CNN's "How the Wheels Came Off" about the near collapse of the U.S. Auto Industry was honored with a National Headliner Award for Business & Consumer Reporting. Velshi anchored CNN's global breaking news coverage of an attempted terror attack on a Delta flight into Detroit on Christmas Day 2009, for which CNN was nominated for a 2010 Emmy award. Velshi was nominated for two additional News & Documentary Emmy awards in 2015 for his contributions at Al Jazeera, including coverage of low wages paid to disabled American workers and a scandal involving red-light cameras in Chicago. In 2017, Velshi was named an honorary "Canada 150" Ambassador to help promote activities and events marking the 150th anniversary of Canada's Confederation. Velshi was named a Poynter Fellow in Journalism at Yale University and accordingly participated in a conversation with students, faculty, and members of the community at Yale University's Jonathan Edwards College in 2017. Also in 2017, Velshi delivered a TEDx talk entitled "How Fake News Grows in a Post Fact World."

Honorary Degrees
Honorary degrees

Pop culture
Referencing Velshi's signature bald , the comedian Jon Stewart has referred to Velshi as the "Hairless Prophet of Doom" on The Daily Show,—the "H-POD" moniker is now frequently repeated by others.

Stephen Colbert referred to Velshi as "CNN's business reporter from our hairless, raceless future" on an episode of The Colbert Report wherein he discussed the 2007–2008 financial crisis.

In addition to appearing on The Daily Show, Velshi appeared on The Oprah Winfrey Show on October 3, 2008, during the global financial crisis and on The View on February 4, 2009, after the launch of his first book on the crisis.

Velshi played himself in the 2010 Oliver Stone film Wall Street: Money Never Sleeps.

During the recurring intro segment of Homeland (season 7) at the 30 second-mark, there is an audio clip of Velshi saying, "...the mood of the country. It's not great...". This audio clip was taken from the August 30, 2017, edition of MSNBC's The 11th Hour (news program) when Velshi was a guest host. His full transcript was: "A new Fox News poll gives us an even closer look at the mood of the country. It's not great."

Memberships and non-profit work
Velshi is a member of the Council on Foreign Relations, the Economic Club of New York, the New York Financial Writers Association, The Paley Center for Media, a member of the Board of Trustees of the Chicago History Museum, a member of the Board of Trustees of Seeds of Peace, and a member of the Grand Challenges Advisory Committee of the National Academy of Engineering. He is also on the Board of Trustees of the X Prize Foundation, which is a non-profit organization that designs and manages public competitions intended to encourage technological development that could benefit humanity.

See also
 Broadcast journalism
 Gujarati people
 Indians in the New York City metropolitan region
 New Yorkers in journalism

References

External links

 
 
 Real Money with Ali Velshi
 Samantha Ettus interviews Ali Velshi
 Ali Velshi on Conversations with Allan Wolper, WBGO.ORG, November 17, 2014

1969 births
Al Jazeera people
Canadian expatriate journalists in the United States
Canadian people of Indian descent
Canadian Ismailis
Canadian Muslims
Canadian people of Gujarati descent
Gujarati people
People from Gujarat
Kenyan people of Indian descent
People from Nairobi
Canadian television news anchors
CNN people
Living people
Kenyan emigrants to Canada
Kenyan people of Gujarati descent
MSNBC people
Journalists from Toronto
Queen's University at Kingston alumni
Khoja Ismailism